Fernanda Maria Young de Carvalho Machado (née Leite Young; 1 May 1970 – 25 August 2019), commonly known as Fernanda Young, was a Brazilian writer, screenwriter, television presenter, model and actress.

Education
Young's literary background was partly formed while crossing the Guanabara Bay by ferry or by bus. She interrupted her studies after graduating from elementary school, and then graduated from high school through a six-month substitute. She attended the Faculty of Arts of the Fluminense Federal University, without graduating. She would still study journalism at Faculdades Integradas Hélio Alonso and, after moving to São Paulo and beginning her writing career, he would become a Radio and Television student at Fundação Armando Alvares Penteado (FAAP), but would not finish any of the courses. Young later stated that she'd sworn never to step on a university campus after the experiments, but later attended Fine Arts at FAAP.

Career
In 2013, she wrote and acted as one of the protagonists of the series Surtadas na Yoga ("Yoga Freaks"), with thirteen episodes in the first season. The series tells the story of three women, Jessica (Young), Ana Maria and Marion (Anna Sophia Folch) who do yoga to "deal with the madness of the world, and their own madness". Due to its success and 115% growth in the GNT audience, in April 2014 a second season was launched with thirteen more episodes. In October 2014, after three seasons, the series was canceled.

Young posed nude for the Brazilian edition of Playboy magazine, launched in November 2009.

In May 2015, she released her eleventh book and the second poetry book of her career, entitled A Mão Esquerda de Vênus ("The Left Hand of Venus"), by Editora Globo. The launch took place at the Vermelho Gallery in São Paulo.

It was announced that she would be in the new version of TV Mulher, a television program aimed at a female audience, with a premiere scheduled for 31 May 2016 on the Viva channel.

At the time of her death, Young was scheduled to debut a new play, Ainda Nada de Novo ("Still Nothing New"), on 12 September at the Cultural Center of São Paulo.

Personal life and death
Young was married to screenwriter and writer Alexandre Machado since 1993 and had four children: twins Cecilia Maddona and Estela May (born 2000); and two adopted children, Catarina Lakshimi (born 2008), and John Gopala (born 2009).

Young died on 25 August 2019, at the age of 49, due to an intense and sudden asthmatic crisis. Young, who had asthma since childhood and always received treatment, was staying at her family's place in Gonçalves, Minas Gerais, where she went to visit them. After the crisis started, she passed out in her bedroom. An ambulance was called, and she was taken to the nearest hospital, located in the city of Paraisópolis. She died of respiratory and cardiac arrest just over an hour after being admitted into ICU. Young was buried in Congonhas Cemetery, in the southern zone of São Paulo, the city where she had lived for fifteen years.

References

External links
 
 

1970 births
2019 deaths
20th-century Brazilian dramatists and playwrights
20th-century Brazilian novelists
20th-century Brazilian women writers
21st-century Brazilian dramatists and playwrights
21st-century Brazilian novelists
21st-century Brazilian women writers
Actors from Rio de Janeiro (state)
Brazilian female models
Brazilian screenwriters
Brazilian television presenters
Brazilian women television presenters
Brazilian women dramatists and playwrights
Brazilian women novelists
Deaths from asthma
People from Niterói
Brazilian women screenwriters